Tekla Trapszo (23 September 1873 – 27 October 1944) was a Polish stage and film actress. She appeared in 20 films between 1911 and 1939.

Selected filmography
 Pod banderą miłości (1929)
 Rena (1938)
 Młody Las (1934)
 Profesor Wilczur (1938)

References

External links

1873 births
1944 deaths
Polish stage actresses
Polish film actresses
Polish silent film actresses
Actresses from Warsaw
20th-century Polish actresses